Nova is a non-profit Belgian movie theater, located in Brussels, which opened in January 1997.

References

External links

kino-climates.org
brusselslife.be

1997 establishments in Belgium
Cinemas in Belgium
Buildings and structures in Brussels